Superficial vein thrombosis (SVT) is a blood clot formed in a superficial vein, a vein near the surface of the body. Usually there is thrombophlebitis, which is an inflammatory reaction around a thrombosed vein, presenting as a painful induration (thickening of the skin) with redness. SVT itself has limited significance (in terms of direct morbidity and mortality) when compared to a deep vein thrombosis (DVT), which occurs deeper in the body at the deep venous system level. However, SVT can lead to serious complications (as well as signal other serious problems, such as genetic mutations that increase one's risk for clotting), and is therefore no longer regarded as a benign condition. If the blood clot is too near the saphenofemoral junction there is a higher risk of pulmonary embolism, a potentially life-threatening complication.

SVT has risk factors similar to those for other thrombotic conditions and can arise from a variety of causes. Diagnosis is often based on symptoms. There are multiple possible treatments, with the goal of providing symptomatic relief and preventing complications.

Signs and symptoms
SVT is recognized by the presence of pain, warmth, redness, and tenderness over a superficial vein. The SVT may present as a "cord-like" structure upon palpation. The affected vein may be hard along its entire length. SVTs tend to involve the legs, though they can affect any superficial vein (e.g. those in the arms).

Complications
SVT in the lower extremities can lead to a dangerous complication in which the clot travels to the lungs, called pulmonary embolism (PE). This is because lower limb SVTs can migrate from superficial veins into deeper veins. In a French population, the percent of people with SVTs that also suffered from PEs was 4.7%. In the same population, deep vein thrombosis (DVT) was found in 24.6% of people with SVTs. However, because superficial veins lack muscular support, any clots that form are far less likely to be squeezed by muscle contraction, dislodged, and induce a PE.

SVTs can recur after they resolve, which is termed "migratory thrombophlebitis." Migratory thrombophlebitis is a complication that may be due to more serious disorders, such as cancer and other hypercoagulable states.

Causes
SVTs of the legs are often due to varicose veins, though most people with varicose veins do not develop SVTs. SVTs of the arms are often due to the placement of intravenous catheters.

Many of the risk factors that are associated with SVT are also associated with other thrombotic conditions (e.g. DVT). These risk factors include age, cancer, history of thromboembolism, pregnancy, use of oral contraceptive medications (containing estrogen), hormone replacement therapy, recent surgery, and certain autoimmune diseases (especially Behçet's and Buerger's diseases). Other risk factors include immobilization (stasis) and laparoscopy.

Hypercoagulable states due to genetic conditions that increase the risk of clotting may contribute to the development of SVT, such as factor V Leiden, prothrombin 20210A mutation, and protein C, S, and antithrombin III and factor XII deficiency.

Mechanism
The mechanism for the development of an SVT depends upon the specific etiology of the SVT. For example, varicose veins and prolonged bed rest both may induce SVTs due to slowing the flow of blood through superficial veins.

Diagnosis
SVTs may be diagnosed based upon clinical criteria by a healthcare professional. A more specific evaluation can be made by ultrasound. An ultrasound can be useful in situations in which an SVT occurs above the knee and is not associated with a varicose vein, because ultrasounds can detect more serious clots like DVTs. The diagnostic utility of D-dimer testing in the setting of SVTs has yet to be fully established.

Classification
SVTs can be classified as either varicose vein (VV) or non-varicose (NV) associated. NV-SVTs are more likely to be associated with genetic procoagulable states compared to VV-SVTs. SVTs can also be classified by pathophysiology. That is, primary SVTs are characterized by inflammation that is localized to the veins. Secondary SVTs are characterized by systemic inflammatory processes.

A subclass of SVTs are septic thrombophlebitis, which are SVTs that occur in the setting of an infection.

Treatment
The goal of treatment in SVT is to reduce local inflammation and prevent the SVT from extending from its point of origin. Treatment may entail the use of compression, physical activity, medications, or surgical interventions. The optimal treatment for many SVT sites (i.e. upper limbs, neck, abdominal and thoracic walls, and the penis) has not been determined.

Compression
Multiple compression bandages exist. Fixed compression bandages, adhesive short stretch bandages, and graduated elastic compression stockings have all be used in the treatment of SVTs. The benefit of compression stockings is unclear, though they are frequently used.

Physical activity
Inactivity is contraindicated in the aftermath of an SVT. Uninterrupted periods of sitting or standing may cause the SVT to elongate from its point of origin, increasing the risk for complications and clinical worsening.

Medications
Medications used for the treatment of SVT include anticoagulants, NSAIDs (except aspirin), antibiotics, and corticosteroids.

Anticoagulants
SVTs that occur within the great saphenous vein within 3 cm of the saphenofemoral junction are considered to be equivalent in risk to DVTs.  These high risk SVTs are treated identically with therapeutic anticoagulation. Anticoagulation is also used for intermediate risk SVTs that are greater than 3 cm from the saphenofemoral junction or are greater than 4–5 cm in length.

Anticoagulation for high risk SVTs includes the use of vitamin K antagonists or novel oral anticoagulants (NOACs) for 3 months. Anticoagulation for intermediate risk SVTs includes fondaparinux 2.5 mg daily for 45 days or the use of intermediate to therapeutic dose low molecular weight heparin for 4–6 weeks.

NSAIDs
NSAIDs (non-steroidal anti-inflammatory drugs) can be used in both oral or topical formulations for the relief of SVT symptoms. The British Committee for Standards in Haematology guidelines recommend the use of NSAIDs for low-risk SVTs (thrombus <4–5 cm in length, no additional risk factors for thromboembolic events). NSAIDs are used for treatment durations of 8–12 days.

Other
Antibiotics are used in the treatment of septic SVT. Corticosteroids are used for the treatment of SVTs in the setting of vasculitic and autoimmune syndromes.

Surgery
Surgical interventions are used for both symptomatic relief of the SVT as well as for preventing the development of more serious complications (e.g. pulmonary embolism). Surgical interventions include ligation of the saphenofemoral junction, ligation and stripping of the affected veins, and local thrombectomy. Because of the risk of symptomatic pulmonary embolism with surgery itself, surgical interventions are not recommended for the treatment of lower limb SVTs by the 2012 American College of Chest Physicians guidelines and the 2012 British Committee for Standards in Haematology guidelines. The use of surgery for the treatment of SVT is controversial.

Prognosis
SVT is often a mild, self-resolving medical condition. The inflammatory reaction may last up to 2–3 weeks, with possible recanalization of the thrombosed vein occurring in 6–8 weeks. The superficial vein may continue to be hyperpigmented for several months following the initial event.

Epidemiology
In a French population, SVT occurred in 0.64 per 1000 persons per year.

History
SVTs have been historically considered to be benign diseases, for which treatment was limited to conservative measures. However, an increased awareness of the potential risks of SVTs developing into more serious complications has prompted more research into the diagnosis, classification, and treatment of SVTs.

Research
A Cochrane review recommends that future research investigate the utility of oral, topical, and surgical treatments for preventing the progression of SVTs and the development of thromboembolic complications.

Footnotes

References

Coagulopathies
Diseases of veins, lymphatic vessels and lymph nodes
Hematology
Vascular-related cutaneous conditions
Angiology
Vascular diseases